The Third String is a 1914 British silent sports comedy film directed by George Loane Tucker and starring June Gail, Frank Stanmore and George Bellamy. The film is based on a short story of the same name by W.W. Jacobs, which was later turned into a 1932 film.

Premise
A man poses as a boxer to impress a barmaid, but this leads to him being forced to fight a champion.

Cast
 June Gail as Julia
 Frank Stanmore as Ginger Dick  
 George Bellamy as Peter Russett  
 Judd Green as Sam Small  
 Charles Rock as Landlord  
 Charles E. Vernon as Bill Lumm

References

Bibliography
 Goble, Alan. The Complete Index to Literary Sources in Film. Walter de Gruyter, 1999.

External links

1915 films
1910s sports comedy films
British sports comedy films
British silent short films
Films based on works by W. W. Jacobs
Films directed by George Loane Tucker
Films set in England
British black-and-white films
Films based on short fiction
1915 comedy films
1914 comedy films
1914 films
1910s English-language films
1910s British films
Silent sports comedy films